Nina is a 2017 Slovak drama film directed by Juraj Lehotský. It was screened in the Contemporary World Cinema section at the 2017 Toronto International Film Festival.

Cast
 Bibiana Nováková
 Robert Roth
 Petra Fornayová
 Josef Kleindienst

References

External links
 

2017 films
2017 drama films
Slovak drama films
Slovak-language films